West Nile campaign may refer to:

 West Nile campaign in 1979, mostly the Battle of Bondo
 West Nile campaign (October 1980)
 West Nile campaign (December 1980)